Mariosousa usumacintensis is a plant species native to the Mexican State of Tabasco. It was named after the Río Usumacinta, near the location where the type specimen was collected.

Mariosousa usumacintensis is a tree up to 15 m (50 feet) tall. Prickles are located at the bases of the petioles, each prickle with a large flat gland near the base.

References

Flora of Tabasco
usumacintensis